W43BR, virtual channel 43 (UHF digital channel 16), is a Retro TV-affiliated television station licensed to Baraboo, Wisconsin, United States and serving the Wisconsin Dells area. Owned by Baraboo Broadcasting, it is sister to radio station WRPQ (740 AM and translator 99.7 FM). The two outlets share studios on 8th Avenue in downtown Baraboo. W43BR's transmitter is situated on the Baraboo Range near Devil's Lake State Park, co-located with WRPQ, WOLX, W290AL, NOAA Weather Radio station KHA-47 and several other telecommunication services. There is no separate website for W43BR; instead, it is integrated with that of sister station WRPQ.

W43BR uses the false callsign of WRPQ-TV on-air to connect to its sister radio station. Baraboo Broadcasting also operates Baraboo's local government access channel for Spectrum.

W43BR's signal is beamed directly north so as not to interfere with Mayville-licensed TBN station WWRS-TV (channel 52), which formerly broadcast on digital channel 43.

W43BR has limited Spectrum cable coverage in the Baraboo/Wisconsin Dells area, along with surrounding portions of Columbia, Sauk, Adams and Juneau counties, and western portions of Dane County on channel 10. It is not carried in the city of Madison.

External links
W43BR

43BR
Retro TV affiliates
Low-power television stations in the United States
Baraboo, Wisconsin